Bounty Seamount is a seamount in the Pacific Ocean, which reaches a depth of  or .

Geology and geomorphology 

These seamounts were discovered in 1989.

Bounty has a conical shape, with three summit cones and several rift zones. Pillow lavas and hyaloclastite cover its slopes, and parasitic vents can be observed as well. Bounty has erupted rocks with compositions of alkali basalt, trachyandesite and trachyte.

Eruption history 

Bounty Seamount was formed in several stages, and it could have developed over a time of 58,000 years. Alkali basalts from Bounty have been dated by potassium-argon dating to be 344,000 ± 32,000 years before present. Nevertheless, traces of recent volcanic activity and of hydrothermal venting have been found.

This hydrothermal venting manifests itself by the release of low-temperature fluids and the formation of iron-rich crusts.

References

Sources 

 
 
 
 

Submarine volcanoes
Hotspot volcanoes
Seamounts of the Pacific Ocean
Landforms of the Pitcairn Islands
Pleistocene volcanoes